Clutch was a literary magazine begun in 1991 by co-editors Daniel Hodge and Lawrence Oberc in Lexington, Kentucky.

The magazine grew out of the editors' interests and experiences in the subculture of alternative presses and little magazines, as well as their previous experience in working on the staffs of literary journals at the University of Kentucky.  After the first issue was published in 1991, the magazine moved its editorial headquarters to San Francisco, where it resided for the remainder of its history.  The sixth and final issue was published with an imprint date of 1997/1998.

Clutch published original poetry and prose by writers including Charles Bukowski, Kurt Nimmo, Lorri Jackson, Peter Plate, John Bennett, Poe Ballantine, Simon Perchik, Robert Peters, Denise Dee and Todd Moore, as well as Hodge and Oberc.  A small press imprint, Drill Press, was originally created as a publishing vehicle for CLUTCH, and also produced some small chapbooks of poetry featuring writers that had appeared in CLUTCH, including Moore and Oberc.

1991 establishments in Kentucky
1998 disestablishments in California
Defunct literary magazines published in the United States
Magazines established in 1991
Magazines disestablished in 1998
Magazines published in Kentucky
Magazines published in San Francisco
Mass media in Lexington, Kentucky